Revolutionary Championship Wrestling is a Midwestern independent professional wrestling promotion based in Portsmouth, Ohio.

History
RCW was formed in early 2002 by Dirk Cunningham who had left the Superstar Wrestling Federation (SWF) after creative differences with Owner Andy Runyon. Soon afterwards several other wrestling stars left the SWF as well due to creative differences.

In mid-2002 Cunningham acquired a ring, promoters license and formed a booking committee featuring himself, Jerry Davis, Jason Taylor, V.L. Stricklett, Ace Gigolo, Jay Vastine, Chris Smith and Exotic E. The first show was booked for West Union, Ohio on November 29, 2002 and was titled "RCW: The Gathering". Notable appearances included surprise appearances by SWF stars "The King" Randy Allen, "The Notorious" Jay Vastine, "Livewire" Chris Smith and Total Nonstop Action Wrestling tag team champion "Wildcat" Chris Harris.

After 2 events, Cunningham disbanded the committee and set forth on running the promotion himself.  By 2013, RCW is still going strong with Cunningham at the helm.

An ongoing storyline thru 2012 was the mysterious Owner of RCW, "The Phoenix".  At the 7 Year Anniversary Show it was discovered that Al Snow was the Owner of RCW, and the man behind the mask. In 2012 at RCW 100, Al Snow's ownership was sold to another mysterious owner. In December 2012, at RCW's 10th Anniversary Event, Dirk Extreme (Cunningham) announced that he was the true owner of RCW. It was also announced that night that Trik Nasty would be the acting owner for 1 year until Extreme retired from active wrestling to not cause a conflict.

RCW has produced over 100 TV episodes. First, a half-hour TV program on the Local WB/CW affiliate (WHCP) that saw 72 original episodes.  RCW then produced a TV Show entitled RCW: Wrestling Shadows which broadcast over-the-air on TV station WTZP The Zone, channel 59 in Chillicothe, Ohio and channel 66 in Portsmouth, Ohio. Shadows still replays on the Zone periodically. RCW is currently at work on an all new show for the area that is due out sometime in 2013.

In January 2013, RCW was affiliated with the movie "Pro Wrestlers vs Zombies" starring Roddy Piper, Jim Duggan, Matt Hardy and others. The RCW Ring is visible in several scenes during the movie.  RCW Talent Dirk Cunningham (Extreme), Tyson Rogers and Randy Allen also appear in the film as Zombies. RCW Cameraman Chris Jones was also used on the film behind the camera.

RCW has an extensive Film Crew that video and edit footage for several companies such as Remix Pro Wrestling, ASW Wrestling, IWA East Coast Wrestling, UVC MMA, Tammy Jo's Dance Studio and Stacey's Dance Studio. Dirk Cunningham with cousin Chris Jones primarily make up the staff.

RCW Roster

RCW Champions

RCW Wrestlers

"Astonishing" Aaron Williams
"Natural" Chad Cruise
"Captivating" Corey Mason
Cyrus Poe
"Dangerous" Damien Kass
"Re-Enforcer" Devlin Anderson
"American Idol" Dirk Extreme
Eclipso
El Nino
Flash Fury
Heavy Metal
Jason "The Gift" Kincaid
Jason Legend
Jimmy "Pretty Boy" Malloy
"Genuine" Jock Samson
Judas Thorn
"Bad News" Keith Hamblin
Mastermind
"Reaper" Matt Conard
"Loony" Mike Horton
Onyx
Randy "The King" Allen
Sara Stricklett
Tommy Chill
Trik Nasty
Tyson Rogers
"Supernatural" Zac Vincent

RCW Past Wrestlers & Managers
Adam Hileman
Al B. Damm
"Awesome" Aaron Andrews
Ace Gigolo
"Attitude" Andy Runyon
Angel
Average White Guy
B.J. Cantrell
Beautiful Bobby L.
Billy McCarty
Bryan Fury
C.O. Hustler
Capt. Kevin Johnson
"Too Bad" Chad Allegra
"Livewire" Chris Smith
Dude Rock
Dregen
Exotic E
Fyre
The Great Meco
The Informer
Ivanna B. Eighton
J.D. Santos
"Too Fine" Jason Taylor
Jay Donaldson
"Heartbreaker" Jay Vastine
 Heidi Loveless/Ruby Riott
Jeremy Maddrox
Josh Hayes
Juggulator
Mace Parker
Maxx Power
"Mean" Mark Manson
Meltdown
Nick Wrath
Nikki Tyler
"Precious" Paul Harley
Peaches
Pele
Sancho
"All American" Shawn Parks
"Too Sexy" Sean Casey
Shigroth
Sin-D
Suicide Kyd
Syren
Tank Runyon
Victor Stone
Vile
"The Giant Killer" Tiny Tim
"Violent" Vance Desmond
Zodiac

RCW Factions
Army of Darkness
The Coven
Excalibur
Weapons of Mass Destruction
I.O.U
Loony's Asylum
Wrestle Ohio

RCW Title History

RCW Championship

RCW Staff

Chris Jones - RCW Videographer
Dirk Cunningham - RCW Owner
Dustie King - RCW Audio Engineer
Eric Schomburg - RCW Photographer
John Reuben - RCW Senior Referee
"WWWorld Famous" Kenny Young - RCW Ring Announcer
Mastermind - RCW Commissioner
RangerBob - RCW Play-By-Play Commentator
Steve Helphenstine - RCW Referee
Trik Nasty - RCW Acting Owner

Superstars That Have Appeared

Barbarian
Big Van Vader
Demolition Ax
"Beautiful" Bobby Eaton
Eugene
Zach Gowen
"Wildcat" Chris Harris
Honky Tonk Man
"The Russian Bear" Ivan Koloff
"Russian Nightmare" Nikita Koloff
Jerry "The King" Lawler
Mad Man Pondo
Ricky Morton
Al Snow
"Dr. Death" Steve Williams

See also
List of independent wrestling promotions in the United States

References

External links
Official Revolutionary Championship Wrestling website
RCW Facebook
RCW Entertainment Facebook

Companies based in Ohio
Professional wrestling in Ohio
Independent professional wrestling promotions based in the Midwestern United States